Guadalupe is one of 58 municipalities located in the Mexican state of Zacatecas. Its municipal seat is located in the town of Guadalupe. It has an area of 804 km². The municipality is located in the southeastern part of the state.

References

Municipalities of Zacatecas